

The 1995 Neftegorsk earthquake occurred on 28 May at  on northern Sakhalin Island in the Russian Far East.

90% of the victims were killed by the collapse of 17 five-story residential buildings. While Western media generally attributed the collapses to allegedly poor construction and shoddy materials of Soviet-era construction, a geotechnical study faulted a failure to accommodate the possibility of soil liquefaction in an area that was considered "practically aseismic".

The Belgian Centre for Research on the Epidemiology of Disasters' EM-DAT database places the total damage at $64.1 million, while the United States' National Geophysical Data Center assesses the damage at $300 million.

This quake was not only catastrophic, it was totally unexpected: earthquakes with magnitudes greater than 6 were not known to occur in the area of northern Sakhalin Island. It is also of great scientific interest (some 20 papers have been published) because it occurred near a poorly known tectonic plate boundary where the Okhotsk Plate (connected with North American Plate) is crashing into the Amurian Plate (part of the Eurasian Plate), and indicates that the plate boundary is associated with a north–south striking seismic belt that runs the length of Sakhalin. More precisely, this earthquake occurred on the Upper Piltoun fault (also known as the Gyrgylan'i—Ossoy fault), which branches off the main Sakhalin-Hokkaido fault that runs along the east side of the island.

(This compares to 14 km of slip estimated to have accumulated on the Sakhalin-Hokkaido fault in the last 4 million years.) The unusual strength of this quake and length of rupturing, and the low level of seismic activity beforehand, has been attributed to the accumulation of strain over a long period of time on a locked fault segment.

See also
 List of earthquakes in 1995
 List of earthquakes in Russia

Notes

Sources
 

 
 .

 .
 .

 
 
 .

 .

 , Paper No. 10.21.

 .

External links
 7.5 Quake Kills 300 on Russia's Sakhalin Island – Los Angeles Times
 The Sakhalin earthquake of May 27, 1995 – Earthquake Engineering Research Institute
 

Neftegorsk Earthquake, 1995
Sakhalin
Neftegorsk Earthquake, 1995
Earthquakes in the Russian Far East
May 1995 events in Asia